Rose Okeno, age 54, is a Kenyan Anglican bishop who became the second female bishop in the history of the Anglican Church of Kenya (ACK) on September 12, 2021.  She is the first full bishop in the Anglican Church of Kenya. Prior to her ordination, she served as acting bishop replacing Bishop Tim Wambunya after his resignation in  September 2020. She was consecrated at Butere Girls High School, defying a movement to put a moratorium on women bishops. Archbishop Jackson Ole Sapit of Kenya presided over the ceremony. Bishop Okeno is the head of Butere Diocese, a largely rural area in Kenya of small-scale farmers and traders. Okeno is the mother of four children and has served the Anglican Church of Kenya (ACK) for 20 years. Bishop Okeno is an advocate for women and girls and for the empowerment of marginalized peoples.

Dispute 
The Global Anglican Future Conference, known as GAFCON  met in Jerusalem, Israel June 17–22, 2018.  At this conference GAFCON called for a moratorium on the ordination of women, "until such a time when a consensus is reached". A "conservative movement in the church," according to Religion News Service, GAFCON was formed in 2008 in response to the acceptance of homosexual clergy and the consecration of Bishop Gene Robinson to the Diocese of New Hampshire by the Episcopal Church in North America in 2003.  Robinson was an openly gay priest in the United States.

Female Anglican Bishops in Africa 
 Bishop Ellinah Ntombi Wamukoya was ordained as bishop of Swaziland Diocese in southern Africa in 2012. She died of COVID-19 in January 2021. 
 Bishop Margaret Vertue was elected bishop in October 2012 and consecrated in 2013 in the South African Diocese of False Bay. 
 Bishop Elizabeth Awut Ngor was consecrated as an assistant bishop in the South Sudan Diocese of Rumbek in 2016. 
 Bishop Emily Onyango was consecrated assistant bishop of Bondo in Kenya on January 20, 2021
 Bishop Rose Okeno was consecrated as a full bishop of Butere Diocese in Kenya on September 12, 2021

References 

Kenyan women
21st-century Anglican bishops of the Anglican Church of Kenya
Anglican Church of Kenya clergy
20th-century Anglican bishops in Africa
Living people
1960s births
Year of birth uncertain